Norman Curtis (10 September 1924 – 7 September 2009) was an English-born footballer, who played as a full back in the Football League in the 1950s and 1960s.

He started his Football League career at a relatively late age, moving from Gainsborough Trinity to Sheffield Wednesday in 1950 when aged 25. Curtis went on to make 324 senior appearances (scoring 24 goals) for Wednesday between 1950–60. During his time at Wednesday the club experienced three promotions and three relegations between the First Division and the Second Division. He was nicknamed 'Cannonball' as when he took Wednesday's penalties he ran from inside his own half.

He moved to Doncaster Rovers for 1960–61 as a player-manager and made 39 league appearances before moving to Buxton for four years as player-manager.

References 

1924 births
2009 deaths
People from Dinnington, South Yorkshire
English footballers
English Football League players
Gainsborough Trinity F.C. players
Sheffield Wednesday F.C. players
Doncaster Rovers F.C. players
Buxton F.C. players
English football managers
Doncaster Rovers F.C. managers
Buxton F.C. managers
English Football League managers
Association football fullbacks